The Damen Stan 4100 patrol vessel design is a design from the Damen Group, a conglomerate of maritime companies based in the Netherlands.
Damen has a long history of designing, licensing out, and building small and medium sized coastal patrol vessels.  All their designs have a four digit code, where the first two digits are the length of the vessel, in metres.

Damen only built a limited number of patrol vessels to the 4100 design, but experience gained with the 4100 design was used when designing the slightly larger 4207 design.  
Several dozen vessels have been built to the Damen Stan 4207 patrol vessel design for a dozen nations.

The Dutch Caribbean Coast Guard operates three 4100 patrol vessels, the Jaguar, Poema and the Panter.
One vessel is stationed at each of Aruba, Curaçao, Sint Maarten.
Vietnam Maritime search and Rescue Coordination Center (VN MRCC) also operates three vessels.

References

Patrol vessels of the Netherlands